The 2008 WPS International Draft took place on September 24, 2008.  It was the first international draft held by Women's Professional Soccer to assign the WPS rights of international players to the American-based teams.  For the 2009 season, teams were able to sign 5 international players to their roster.

Round 1

Round 2

Round 3

Round 4

Draft notes
Draft order was determined by weighted results from a coach's poll about the strength of each team's USWNT allocation, which had occurred earlier that month.

See also
List of foreign WPS players

External links
Complete draft coverage

2008
International Draft
Lists of women's association football players
Association football player non-biographical articles
WPS International Draft